Nohant-en-Goût is a commune in the Cher department in the Centre-Val de Loire region of France.

Geography

Population

Sights
 The church of St. Blaise and the war memorial.
 Vestiges of an old church, dating from the twelfth century.
 The fifteenth-century chateau du Préau.
 Traces of an old castle at La Motte.

See also
Communes of the Cher department

References

External links

Old postcard photographs of the commune 

Communes of Cher (department)